Carol Mochan is a Scottish Labour politician. She has been a Member of the Scottish Parliament (MSP) for the South Scotland region since the election in May 2021.

Career
Mochan grew up in Ayrshire, attending Girvan Primary School and Auchinleck Academy. She worked in the NHS as a dietician for 17 years and during this time built up a wealth of experience around the needs of people and the extent of inequality within society. She is a lifelong dedicated and active trade union member. She lives in Mauchline, Ayrshire, running a small family business. Before her election to the Scottish Parliament she was active in many roles within the community: a member of the community council and community association, chair of a parent led toddler group, and part of the school parent council. She has served as Chair of the Carrick Cumnock and Doon Valley Constituency Labour Party and was a candidate in the council elections for East Ayrshire Council in 2017.

She stood for the UK Parliamentary seat of Ayr, Carrick and Cumnock in 2017 and for the Scottish Parliamentary seat of Carrick, Cumnock and Doon Valley in 2016 and 2021. She was elected as one of Scottish Labour's three regional MSPs for South Scotland in 2021. She was appointed to the Shadow Cabinet as Shadow Minister for Mental Wellbeing, Women's Health and Sport.

Personal life
She is married and has two children. Mochan identifies as a socialist and a feminist.

References

External links 
 

Year of birth missing (living people)
Living people
People from Girvan
Labour MSPs
Members of the Scottish Parliament 2021–2026
Female members of the Scottish Parliament
Scottish feminists
Scottish socialists